Athis-Val de Rouvre is a commune in the department of Orne, northwestern France, the municipality was established on 1 January 2016 by merger of the former communes of Athis-de-l'Orne (the seat), Bréel, La Carneille, Notre-Dame-du-Rocher, Ronfeugerai, Ségrie-Fontaine, Taillebois and Les Tourailles.

See also 
Communes of the Orne department

References 

Communes of Orne
Populated places established in 2016
2016 establishments in France